
This is a list of players who graduated from the Nationwide Tour in 2004. The top 20 players on the Nationwide Tour's money list in 2004 earned their PGA Tour card for 2005.

*PGA Tour rookie for 2005.
T = Tied
Green background indicates the player retained his PGA Tour card for 2006 (finished inside the top 125).
Yellow background indicates the player did not retain his PGA Tour card for 2006, but retained conditional status (finished between 126–150).
Red background indicates the player did not retain his PGA Tour card for 2006 (finished outside the top 150).

Runners-up on the PGA Tour in 2006

See also
2004 PGA Tour Qualifying School graduates

References
Schedule
Money list
Player profiles

Korn Ferry Tour
PGA Tour
Nationwide Tour Graduates
Nationwide Tour Graduates